ROCS Yung Shun may refer to one of the following ships of the Republic of China Navy:

 , the former American  USS Logic (AM-258)
 , the former American Admirable-class minesweeper USS Magnet (AM-260)

Republic of China Navy ship names